is a Japanese singer and songwriter. Regarded as an influential figure in the city pop genre, she is one of the best-selling music artists in Japan, having sold over 16 million records, and has received several accolades. Her husband is Tatsuro Yamashita, a singer-songwriter and record producer.

Takeuchi was born in Taisha, Hikawa district, now the city of Izumo, Shimane, and attended Keio University. She made her singing debut after signing with the RCA record label in 1978, with whom she released her debut album , which peaked at No. 17 on Oricon Charts. She then released four albums between 1979 and 1981, all of which obtained commercial success, including the 1980 album , which became her first work to peak at No. 1 on Oricon Charts. Takeuchi then announced she would go on a temporary hiatus in 1981, terminating her contract with RCA records. Three years later, Takeuchi and her husband Tatsuro Yamashita signed with Moon Records, and she made her comeback with her sixth studio album Variety in 1984, which was released internationally and shot her to mainstream success, and peaked at No. 1 on Oricon Charts. The track "Plastic Love" was released in 1985 as a single, and became a surprise hit outside of Japan in 2017, after a YouTube upload of the song went viral. The song has since attained a cult following and is seen as the staple in a revival of interest in city pop in the late 2010s.

Following the success of her ventures throughout the late 1970s and 1980s, Takeuchi began releasing albums less frequently, her latest release being in 2014 as she shifted her focus to work and releasing standalone singles. Since 1981, every single she has released has charted on the Oricon Charts. She has stayed with the Moon record label, working with the different branches since signing in 1984 and since 1998 has been signed with Warner Music Japan, with whom she released the single  in 2012, for which she re-recorded in 2020; the latter of which charted at No. 1 on Oricon Charts, making her the oldest Japanese singer to achieve a No. 1 single.

Early life
Takeuchi was born in Taisha in the Hikawa district of Shimane Prefecture in Japan. She grew up in the family Shinise Ryokan (Japanese long-established inn) business by the name of Takenoya, that her paternal great grandfather  founded in 1877. Her family always played records from all over the world. She had already learned to play piano and guitar by third grade, but the Beatles left an impression that inspired her to travel.

In 1972, for her third year of high school, she studied in Rock Falls, Illinois, United States, as an international exchange student through the AFS Intercultural Programs. Her nickname was Mako, as one of the AFS yearbooks has a caption that reads Mariya "Mako" Takeuchi. She entered the Japanese Keio University in 1974, majoring in English literature and won a nationwide English recitation contest by The Japan Times in the spring of that year. She married fellow musician Tatsuro Yamashita in April 1982. They have one daughter.

Career 
Takeuchi joined the music club of her university and there she was invited to participate in 's recordings and in March 1978 so-called the omnibus album  recordings. In August that year she signed up with the RCA recording label, and in November her debut single , and her debut album  were released. The 1980 single  was also another hit. Takeuchi has had one song  (1981) that appear on the NHK program Minna no Uta.

From the late 1970s to the early 1980s, she recorded five albums and several singles. Those recordings featured dozens of prominent Japanese and North American songwriters, instrumentalists and producers, including Kazuhiko Katō, Tetsuji Hayashi, Shigeru Suzuki, Masamichi Sugi, Shigeru Suzuki, Takashi Matsumoto, Al Capps, Peter Allen, David Lasley, Alan O'Day, David Foster, Jim Keltner, Jay Graydon, Steve Lukather, Jeff Porcaro, David Hungate, and a fellow RCA artist and her future partner and husband, Tatsuro Yamashita. One of her songs from the 1980 album , "Heart to Heart" (music by Roger Nichols), was given English lyrics and a new title, "Now". It was recorded by the Carpenters, released in 1983, and was the last recording by Karen Carpenter before her death. At the end of 1981, after the release of her fifth album , she announced she was going to take a break for a while and paused holding concerts and new releases, and got married six months later. While taking a break she continued composing for numerous different idols and singers such as Naoko Kawai, Hiroko Yakushimaru, Yukiko Okada, Akina Nakamori, Miho Nakayama, Hiromi Iwasaki, Masahiko Kondo, among many others.

Takeuchi has often re-recorded those songs for her own album. , a song originally written for the album by Akina Nakamori, became known by the composer's recorded version, and had been covered by many artists. "Genki wo Dashite", a song first recorded by Hiroko Yakushimaru, is recognized as one of Takeuchi's notable compositions. The song was later covered by Hitomi Shimatani in 2003, and became a moderate hit.

Since her return to the Japanese music industry in 1984, she has recorded seven successful studio albums that mainly consist of her self-written songs, and all of them had reached No. 1 on the Japanese Oricon chart. In addition to her work as a performer, she has continued writing songs and lyrics for other singers, including Ryōko Hirosue, Takako Matsu, Riho Makise, Seiko Matsuda, Masayuki Suzuki and Tackey & Tsubasa.

Several of these songs scored top-ten on the Oricon, such as  performed by Ryōko Hirosue, "Miracle Love" performed by Riho Makise,  performed by Takako Matsu, and  performed by Mana Ashida.Up to September 2014, Takeuchi had released 12 studio albums, 42 singles, several compilations and a live album which was recorded in 2000. Her total sales have been estimated at more than 16 million units by 2009. Her 1994 compilation, Impressions, sold more than 3 million copies in Japan alone, and became her best-selling album. In addition to her musical career, she has also managed her family's Ryokan Takenoya since May 2018 "until the next generation can take over".
Outside of Japan, she is best known for the city pop song "Plastic Love" from her number-one album Variety (1984). At the time of the song's release, Takeuchi had not considered attempting to release her music in the Western world, stating in a 2018 interview, "Considering that [the song] was mostly performed in Japanese, we figured it would be impossible to go abroad." The song went viral after it was uploaded to YouTube during the mid-late 2010s. Popularized overseas via the vaporwave and future funk scenes, the song has received more than 67 million views on YouTube as of June 2021. It has received critical acclaim, with Noisey calling it "the best pop song in the world" and Gorillaz calling it "a wonder woman slab of Japanese funk". K-pop singer Yubin's "City Love" is also based on this song. The Blessed Madonna closed a Resident Advisor November 2017 mix with a rendition of this song as well. Chai released a cover of the song in 2020. "Plastic Love" has also inspired numerous fan art and videos. On 17 May 2019, Warner Music Japan released on YouTube a short version of a music video for the song, 35 years after its initial release. A longer, five minute version was subsequently released on 11 November 2021.

Discography

Studio albums

Compilations

Singles 
{| class="wikitable" style=text-align:center;
|-
! Year
! Title
! width="40"|  Chart positions (JP)
! width="40"|  Album 
|-
| 1978
|align=left| 
| 84
| BEGINNING
|-
|rowspan=2| 1979
|align=left| 
| 30
| UNIVERSITY STREET
|-
|align=left| 
| 39
|rowspan="2"| LOVE SONGS
|-
|rowspan=3| 1980
|align=left| 
| 3
|-
|align=left| 
| 42
|rowspan="2"| Miss M
|-
|align=left| 
| did not chart
|-
|rowspan=3| 1981
|align=left| 
| 80
|rowspan="2"| PORTRAIT
|-
|align=left| 
| did not chart
|-
|align=left|  / 
| 70
| PORTRAIT (#1)Turntable (#2)
|-
|rowspan=2| 1984
|align=left|  / 
| 20
|rowspan="3"| VARIETY
|-
|align=left| 
| 78
|-
| 1985
|align=left| 
| 5
|-
|rowspan=2| 1986
|align=left| 
| 20
|rowspan="3"| REQUEST
|-
|align=left| 
| 46
|-
|rowspan=2| 1987
|align=left| 
| 43
|-
|align=left|  / 
| 55
| REQUEST (#1) Quiet Life (#2)
|-
| 1988
|align=left| 
| 70
| REQUEST
|-
| 1989
|align=left| 
| 2
|rowspan="5"| Quiet Life
|-
| 1990
|align=left| 
| 3
|-
|rowspan=2| 1992
|align=left| 
| 11
|-
|align=left| 
| 18
|-
| 1993
|align=left| 
| 42
|-
|rowspan=3| 1994
|align=left| 
| 19
|rowspan="2"| Impressions
|-
|align=left| 
| 5
|-
|align=left| {{nihongo|"Honki de Only You (Let's Get Married)"|本気でオンリーユー (Let's Get Married)||Seriously, Only You (Let's Get Married)'''}} /  (Re-issue)
| 48
| VARIETY (#1) Quiet Life (#2)
|-
| 1995
|align=left| 
| 3
|rowspan="7"| Bon Appetit!
|-
| 1996
|align=left|  / 
| 13
|-
| 1998
|align=left|  / 
| 1
|-
| 1999
|align=left|  / 
| 6
|-
|rowspan=3| 2001
|align=left| 
| 7
|-
|align=left| 
| 40
|-
|align=left| 
| 30
|-
|rowspan=3| 2006
|align=left|  / "
| 8
|rowspan="3"| Denim
|-
|align=left| 
| 30
|-
|align=left| 
| 19
|-
| 2007
|align=left|  (duet with Yuko Hara) / 
| 23
| Expressions (#1)Denim (#2)
|-
|rowspan=2| 2008
|align=left|  / 
| 6
| Expressions
|-
|align=left| 
| 12
|rowspan="8"| TRAD
|-
| 2010
|align=left| 
| 18
|-
| 2012
|align=left| 
| 10
|-
|rowspan=3| 2013
|align=left| 
| 15
|-
|align=left|  / 
| 7
|-
|align=left|  (download limited)
| 
|-
|rowspan=2| 2014
|align=left| " (download limited)
| 
|-
|align=left| 
| 10
|-
|rowspan=2| 2016
|align=left|  (duet with Tatsuro Yamashita) (download limited)
| 
| Expressions
|-
|align=left|  (download limited)
| 
|rowspan="4"|
|-
| 2018
|align=left|  / 
| 6
|-
| 2019
|align=left| 
| 3
|-
| 2020
|align=left| 
| 1
|-
|}

 Songs written for other singers 

 References 

 External links 
  (in Japanese)
 
 Warner Music Japan | Mariya Takeuchi (Japanese)
 History of Takeuchi family on the Takenoya'' roykan site

1955 births
Living people
20th-century Japanese women singers
20th-century Japanese singers
21st-century Japanese women singers
21st-century Japanese singers
Keio University alumni
Japanese women pop singers
Japanese women singer-songwriters
Musicians from Shimane Prefecture
Disco musicians
English-language singers from Japan
People from Izumo, Shimane